Volkoderi is a village in the Resen Municipality of North Macedonia, northwest of Lake Prespa and near Galičica Mountain.

History
Volkoderi was recorded as having 11 households and 32 male inhabitants in 1873.

The village suffered during the Ilinden Uprising. Ten of the village's homes were burnt down and herds of cattle were taken by the Ottoman Turks.

Demographics
Volkoderi has a population of 114 people and is one of only four villages in Resen Municipality that saw a population increase from the 1994 census to the most recent one in 2002.

References

Villages in Resen Municipality